Wynyard (/ˈwɪnjɚd/) wi-nyuhd) is a rural town located on the North West coast of Tasmania, Australia. As of the 2021 census, Wynyard has an estimated population of 6,296 The town is a regional hub servicing the surrounding rural areas, the adjacent Burnie Wynyard Airport provides commercial flights to Melbourne and other districts. The main council offices for the Waratah-Wynyard local government area are located in Wynyard.

History
Three ex-convict Alexander brothers established a settlement, Alexandria, on the west, or Table Cape, side of the Inglis River in the 1850s. They bought large areas of farmland on Table Cape and built several small ships for produce and timber trading. Shortly afterwards, Wynyard town, on the east side of the river, was laid out, but lagged well behind Alexandria which had a church and several shops including a blacksmith and general store. After the Inglis River was bridged in 1861, Alexandria began to fade and Wynyard, with better wharfing, became the district's centre of commerce.

Wynyard was probably named after Major-General Edward Buckley Wynyard in the early 1850s. Table Cape Post Office opened around 1856 and was renamed Wynyard in 1882.

Wynyard handled more shipping than Burnie in the late nineteenth century and its population reached 500 by 1900. However, in the 20th century Burnie flourished and become the dominant regional and industrial hub for the region.

Demographics

Ancestry and immigration 
As of the 2021 census, the most common ancestries were English 46.4%, Australian 45.1%, Scottish 9.6%, Irish 8.9% and Australian Aboriginal 8.7%.

Religion 
Residents reported religious affiliation as: No Religion 50%, Anglican 12.7%, Catholic 12.5%, Not Stated 7.2% and Uniting Church 5.1%.

Community

Radio
Coast FM is a volunteer community radio station servicing the North-West coast of Tasmania, with the studio based in Wynyard.

Sports
The Wynyard Yacht Club was established in 1961 and is situated near the mouth of the Inglis River, the club has received national recognition for its inclusiveness programs.

The Wynyard Cricket Club was admitted to the NWTCA competition for the 1952/53 season. The club has produced some outstanding players, and many state representatives.

Wonders of Wynyard
The Wonders of Wynyard visitor information centre hosts a substantial classic vintage cars collection which was donated to the Waratah-Wynyard Council by the collector and restorer, Francis Ransley.

Coastal pathway 
The development of a coastal pathway will connect Wynyard and Burnie to Latrobe as part of a State Government and Local Government Council initiative to upgrade infrastructure on the north-west coast of Tasmania.

Arts 

A community art centre, Artscape, has been operated by a volunteer committee since 2007. The centre hosts community groups, exhibitions and provides a space in which the community can foster their own artistic events.

Infrastructure

Education
There are currently two government funded public schools in Wynyard, including Table Cape Primary School and Wynyard High School. There is also a catholic primary school, St Brigid's, adjacent to the catholic church of the same name.

Previously, Wynyard Primary School (located at Gibbons Street) and Inglis Primary School (located at Bowick Street) existed separately. Both were renamed to Table Cape Primary School in 1998. The two school campuses were then merged in 2009, with the closing of the Bowick Street campus.

Geographical features

Freestone Cove
Freestone Cove is a small sheltered bay on the northern fringes of Wynyard, towards Table Cape.

Fossil Bluff

In the 19th century, it was the discovery site of Australia's oldest fossil marsupial, Wynyardia bassiana, an extinct possum-like animal from the early Miocene (about 25 million years ago). Also recovered was an extinct genus of whale, Prosqualodon.

Aboriginal fish traps

It is believed the Aboriginal Tommeginer clan built tidal fish traps with rocks at Freestone Cove, the rocks are still evident today and are protected under the Aboriginal Relics Act. The Tommeginer tribe lived in the region along the coastline around Wynyard and Table Cape until soon after the arrival of Europeans in the 19th century.

A considerable number of tidal fish traps have been found in the north and north-west of the state. The phenomena is attributed to the mean tidal range of two metres along this stretch of coastline, which is ideal for this type of construction. Whilst some of these traps were certainly built by Europeans, there is good reason to believe others were of Aboriginal construction, such as at Freestone Cove. Three other traps located at nearby Rocky Cape, Sisters Beach and Boat Harbour do not have established European origins, furthermore, all are located within the territory which was occupied by the Tommeginer tribe.

Tidal fish traps must be located close to settlements or camps so that they can be monitored. Because as the tide ebbs, any fish caught in the shallows fall easy prey to scavenging seabirds. The Freestone Cove traps are located a considerable distance from the nearest early European settlement of Alexandria, but were close to known Aboriginal campsites and several middens have been located along the shoreline nearby.

Inglis River
Wynyard is located around the mouth of the Inglis River, which extends approximately 61 kilometres to the Campbell Ranges near Takone.

Table Cape
The area is renowned for the annual flowering of tulips during spring and accompanying tulip festival. Situated on the edge of Table Cape is the heritage-listed Table Cape Lighthouse which remains in operation today.

Climate

Notable residents

 F. M. Alexander the creator of the Alexander technique was born on the northern bank of the Inglis River at a settlement called Alexandria, situated about three km upstream from the river mouth. He later moved to Waratah, Melbourne, London and New York to pursue acting and teaching.
 Carla Boyd is a retired Australian women's basketball player who was born in Wynyard. Boyd Competed at the 1996 and 2000 Olympic Games, and the 1998 World Championship, winning medals at all three events (1 silver and 2 bronze).

Gallery

References

 
Localities of Waratah–Wynyard Council
Towns in Tasmania